The Kangwon-Land Cup is a Go competition.

Outline 

The countries that compete are China and Korea. The competition is in knockout style. Both countries select 6 players to play for them in this competition. They then choose in which order they wish for the players to play. First, the competition is started when two players play. Whoever wins goes on and plays the next player. If they win they go on again and play the next person. However, if they lose, they are out of the tournament completely. The tournament is sponsored by Kangwon Land. The winner's purse is 150 million South Korean Won ($154,000). If a player wins three games in a row, they are awarded an extra 10 million Won ($10,000).

Past winners 

Country

Player with most consecutive wins.

1st Kangwon-Land Cup

References 

International Go competitions